Wayne Radford (May 29, 1956 – January 10, 2021) was an American professional basketball player for the Indiana Pacers of the National Basketball Association (NBA).  At 6'3" and 205 pounds, he played the guard position.

Born in Indianapolis, Indiana, Radford was a three-year letterman at Arlington High School and a 1974 Indiana All Star.  He attended Indiana University Bloomington during the 1970s  and played for the Hoosiers' undefeated  1975–76 national championship team.

Radford was selected by the Indiana Pacers in the second round of the 1978 NBA draft.  He played 52 games for the Pacers during the 1978-79 NBA season, averaging 3.9 points, 1.1 assists, and 1.3 rebounds.

Radford died January 10, 2021, at age 64.

References

External links
NBA statistics

1956 births
2021 deaths
African-American basketball players
American men's basketball players
Basketball players from Indianapolis
Indiana Hoosiers men's basketball players
Indiana Pacers draft picks
Indiana Pacers players
Point guards
Shooting guards
20th-century African-American sportspeople
21st-century African-American people